The Palais des Sports de Pau is an indoor sporting arena that is located in Pau, France.  The seating capacity of the arena for basketball games is 7,707 people, and the arena also includes a 500 capacity in private lodge areas.

History
Palais des Sports de Pau has been used as the home arena of the Élan Béarnais Pau-Orthez French professional basketball team, since it opened in 1991. It has also frequently hosted games of the senior men's French national basketball team.  It is the largest basketball-specific arena in France.

See also
 List of indoor arenas in France

References

External links
 L'Histoire du Palais de Sports

Indoor arenas in France
Basketball venues in France
Buildings and structures in Pau
Sport in Pau, Pyrénées-Atlantiques
Sports venues in Pyrénées-Atlantiques
Sports venues completed in 1991